is a 1999 Japanese horror film  directed by Takashi Miike, based on the 1997 novel by Ryu Murakami. Starring Ryo Ishibashi and Eihi Shiina, the film is about a widower, Shigeharu Aoyama (Ishibashi), who stages a phony audition to meet a potential new romantic partner. After interviewing several women, Aoyama becomes interested in Asami (Shiina), whose dark past affects their relationship.

Audition was originally a project of the Japanese company Omega Project, who wanted to make a horror film after the great financial success of their previous production Ring. To create the film, the company purchased the rights to Murakami's book and hired screenwriter Daisuke Tengan and director Miike to film an adaptation. The cast and crew consisted primarily of people Miike had worked with on previous projects, with the exception of Shiina, who had worked as a model prior to her career in film. The film was shot in about three weeks in Tokyo.

Audition premiered, with a few other Japanese horror films, at the Vancouver International Film Festival, but it received much more attention when it was shown at the Rotterdam International Film Festival in 2000, where it received the FIPRESCI Prize and the KNF Award. Following a theatrical release in Japan, the film continued to play at festivals and had theatrical releases in the United States and United Kingdom, followed by several home media releases.

Audition was received positively by Western film critics on its release, with many noting the final torture sequence in the film and how it contrasts with the non-horrific scenes before. The film has appeared on several lists of the best horror films ever made, and has had an influence on other horror films and directors including Eli Roth and the Soska sisters.

Plot
Shigeharu Aoyama is a widower whose son Shigehiko says that he should find a new wife. Shigeharu's friend Yasuhisa Yoshikawa, a film producer, devises a mock casting audition at which young women audition for the "part" of Shigeharu's new wife. Shigeharu agrees to the plan and is immediately enchanted by Asami Yamazaki, attracted to her apparent emotional depth.

Yasuhisa cannot reach any of the references in Asami's résumé, such as a music producer she said she worked for, who is missing. However, Shigeharu is so enthralled by her that he pursues her anyway. She lives in an empty apartment, containing a sack and a phone. For four days after the audition, she sits perfectly still next to the phone waiting for it to ring. When it finally does, she answers, pretending that she never expected Shigeharu to call. After several dates, she agrees to accompany him to a seaside hotel, where Shigeharu intends to propose marriage. At the hotel, Asami reveals burn scars on her body. Before having sex, Asami demands that Shigeharu pledge his love to her and no one else. Deeply moved, Shigeharu agrees. In the morning, Asami is nowhere to be found.

Shigeharu tries to track her down using her résumé, but as Yasuhisa warned, all of the contacts are dead ends. At the dance studio where she said she was trained, he finds a man with prosthetic feet. The bar where she said she worked has been abandoned for a year following the murder and dismemberment of the owner. A passerby tells Shigeharu that the police found three extra fingers, an extra ear, and an extra tongue when they recovered the body; Shigeharu has hallucinations of the body pieces. Meanwhile, Asami goes to Shigeharu's house and finds a photo of his late wife. Enraged, she drugs his liquor. Shigeharu comes home, pours a drink, and after a short while feels the effects of the drug. A flashback shows that the sack in Asami's apartment contains a man missing both feet, his tongue, one ear and three fingers on one hand. He crawls out and begs for food. Asami vomits into a dog dish and places it on the floor for the man. The man sticks his face into the vomit and hungrily consumes it.

Shigeharu collapses from the drug. Asami injects him with a paralytic agent that leaves his nerves alert, and tortures him with needles. She tells him that, just like everyone else in her life, he has failed to love only her. She cannot tolerate his feelings for anyone else, even his own son. She inserts needles into the skin below his eyes, saying "deeper" continuously as she does so. She then cuts off his left foot with a wire saw. Shigehiko returns home as Asami begins to cut off Shigeharu's other foot, and she sneaks up on him with a can of mace. As she attacks the boy, Shigeharu appears to suddenly wake up back in the hotel after he and Asami had sex, and his current ordeal seems to be only a nightmare; Shigeharu proposes marriage and Asami accepts. As he falls back asleep in the hotel, he returns to reality - his previous awakening having been false - to find his son fighting Asami. Shigehiko kicks her downstairs, breaking her neck. Shigeharu tells his son to call the police and stares at the dying Asami, who repeats what she said on one of their dates about her excitement on seeing him again.

Cast
Eihi Shiina as 
Ryo Ishibashi as 
Jun Kunimura as 
Tetsu Sawaki as 
Miyuki Matsuda as 
Toshie Negishi as 
 Shigeru Saiki as 
Ken Mitsuishi as 
Ren Ohsugi as 
Renji Ishibashi as

Themes
Critics have considered Audition as both feminist and misogynistic. Miike has stated that when he met journalists in the United Kingdom and France, he found they commented on the film's feminist themes when Asami gets revenge on the men in her life. The film sets up Aoyama with traits and behaviors which could be considered sexist: a list of criteria for his bride to meet, and the phoney audition format he uses to search for future wife. Tom Mes, author of Agitator: The Cinema of Takashi Miike, stated that the torture sequence, with the mutilation of Aoyama, can be seen as revenge from Asami. Dennis Lim of the Los Angeles Times examined similar themes, noting that the film is "ultimately about the male fear of women and female sexuality" and that women are blatantly objectified in the first half of the film, only to have Asami "redress this imbalance" in the second half when she becomes an "avenging angel". Chris Pizzello, writing in the American Cinematographer, stated that one plausible approach to interpreting the film is to see the final act as a representation of Aoyama's guilt at his mistreatment of women and his desire to dominate them. Aoyama develops a paranoid fantasy of an attacking object: because he harbours sadistic thoughts towards women, he develops a fear that the object will retaliate. Contrary to this, Miike has stated that the final torture scenes in the film are not a paranoid nightmare dreamed up by Aoyama. Tom Mes has argued against the feminist portrayal of the film, noting that Asami is not motivated by an ideological agenda, and that acknowledging that she takes revenge on a man who has lied to her would be ignoring that she has also lied to Aoyama. Asami states "I want to tell you everything" during the torture scene, implying she had not been truthful before. Mes also notes that the avenging angel theme contradicts a feminist-themed revenge interpretation, given that one of Asami's victims is female.

In Audition, the character of Asami is a victim of child abuse. Colette Balmain, in her book Introduction to Japanese Horror Film, described Asami as "just one more face of the wronged women in Japanese culture... They are victims of repression and oppression, and only death and loneliness remain for them". The film critic Robin Wood wrote that through her child abuse, Asami is taught that love and pain must be inseparable. The audience is led to identify with Asami through this victimization and also what Stephen LeDrew described as a "patriarchal Japanese society". Elvis Mitchell (The New York Times) stated that the theme of the film was: "the objectification of women in Japanese society and the mirror-image horror of retribution it could create". Tom Mes suggested that these themes can be witnessed in the scene where Asami feeds her mutilated prisoner and then turns into the childhood version of herself and pets him like a dog. Mes concludes that this is done to suggest that what had happened in Asami's life had made her the violent adult seen in the film.

Production

Development

The main production company behind Audition was the Japanese company Omega Project. Omega were originally behind the production of Hideo Nakata's film Ring; this was a great success in Japan and, subsequently, the rest of Asia. Omega had problems setting up the release of Ring in Korea and had the company AFDF Korea work on a Korean re-adaptation of Ring. The following year, in 1998, Omega partnered again with AFDF Korea and other production companies including Creators Company Connection, Film Face, and Bodysonic to make the adaptation of Ryū Murakami's 1997 novel Audition. Omega wanted to create a film different from the supernatural-themed Ring, and chose to adapt Murakami's novel, which lacked this trait. To attempt something different, they hired a screenwriter (Daisuke Tengan) and a director (Takashi Miike) who were not known for working on horror films. Prior to Audition, Tengan was best known as a screenwriter for working with his father (Shohei Imamura) on The Eel, which won the Palme d'Or in 1997.

Pre-production
To create Audition, Miike worked with many of his previous collaborators, such as cinematographer Hideo Yamamoto. Miike spoke of his cinematographer by saying that Yamamoto was: "very sensitive towards death. Both of his parents died very young, and it's not something he talks about much". Miike also noted that he felt that Yamamoto was: "living in fear, and that sensibility comes through in his work. It's something I want to make the most of". The film's score was composed by Kōji Endō. Endō had previously composed work for Miike on films such as The Bird People in China. Yasushi Shimamura was the film's editor. Shimamura had worked with Miike as early as Lady Hunter: Prelude To Murder in 1991.

Actor Ryo Ishibashi wanted to work with Miike and agreed to the role. He commented that despite not being a great fan of horror films, he enjoyed scripts, such as that of Audition, that showcased human nature. Model Eihi Shiina was cast in the film as Asami. Shiina's career was primarily as a model and she only began acting after being offered a film role while she was on holidays. Shiina first learned about Miike through his film Blues Harp, which made her interested in meeting the director. When Shiina first met Miike, they began talking about her opinions on love and relationships. On their second meeting, Miike asked Shiina to play the part of Asami. Shiina thought that the opinions and feelings she expressed to Miike were the reason she was cast in the role, and she tried to play the role as naturally as she could without going over the top.

Production
Audition was shot in approximately three weeks, which was about one more week than usual for Miike's films at the time. Scenes such as those in Asami's apartment and at a restaurant were shot on location in a real apartment and a real restaurant. Outdoor scenes were shot in Tokyo, along intersections in Omotesandō.

The torture scene at the end of the film did not initially contain Asami's lines "Kiri-kiri-kiri". Shiina was initially whispering her lines while filming this scene, but after discussion with Miike, the two decided that having her say these lines would make the scene scarier. Ishibashi found that Miike was "having so much fun with that scene", and that Miike was especially excited when Ishibashi's character's feet are cut off. For the special effects where Shiina's character places acupuncture needles into Ishibashi, special effects make-up was used to create a mask layer which was laid upon Ishibashi's eyes, which is then pierced by the needles.

Release

Theatrical

Audition had its world premiere on October 2, 1999 at the Vancouver International Film Festival. The premiere was part of a program of modern Japanese horror films at the festival, including Ring, Ring 2, Shikoku and Gemini. Audition was screened at the 29th Rotterdam International Film Festival in The Netherlands in early 2000 where it was shown as part of a Miike retrospective.  Tom Mes stated that Audition received the most attention at Rotterdam, where it won the FIPRESCI Prize for the best film of competition. The FIPRESCI award was given by a jury of international film journalists, who grant this award during the Rotterdam International Film Festival. Only films not in competition qualify for the award. Audition also won the KNF Award, voted by the Circle of Dutch Film journalists.

Audition was released theatrically in Japan on March 3, 2000. When asked about the reception in Japan, Miike stated that there was "no reaction" as the film was shown in small theaters for a short theatrical run. Miike followed up that the Japanese audience did not really know about Audition until it received a greater reputation abroad. It received its American premiere at the Seattle International Film Festival in 2000. The film was given its theatrical release in the United States on August 8, 2001. It eventually grossed $131,296 in the country.

In the United Kingdom, Audition received screenings in 2000 at both FrightFest and the Raindance Film Festival. It was released theatrically in the United Kingdom by Metro Tartan in mid-March 2001. It was Miike's first film to be released theatrically in the United Kingdom.

Home media 
Audition was released on DVD in the United States by Chimera on June 4, 2002. The DVD included an interview with Miike and a documentary on the Egyptian Theater in Los Angeles. A new DVD was released by Lionsgate in 2005 dubbed the "uncut special edition". This release included an interview with Ryu Murakami, a selected scene commentary by Miike, and a clip from Bravo's The 100 Scariest Movie Moments. Peter Schorn of IGN gave a negative review of the 2006 DVD, finding that the video was "overcompressed to the point that a distracting, shifting blockiness frequently in backgrounds that draws the eye away from the actors". IGN concluded that the: "overall image quality is soft and fuzzy, with weak black levels, murky shadow areas and less-than-impressive color saturation". On October 6, 2009, Shout! Factory released a DVD and Blu-ray release of the film that featured an introduction by Miike and actress Eihi Shiina, a full audio commentary by Miike and screenwriter Daisuke Tengan, and a documentary featuring the cast.

Audition was released in the United Kingdom on DVD by Tartan Video on June 28, 2004. The disc contained an interview with Miike and liner notes by Joe Cornish. Matthew Leyland (Sight & Sound) reviewed this release, stating that the audio and visual presentation was "exemplary" while noting that the interview with Miike was the only noteworthy bonus feature on the disc. The film was later released by Arrow Video on February 29, 2016. The Arrow Video release was exclusively restored in 2K resolution and was scanned from a 35mm interpositive.

Reception 
On Rotten Tomatoes, the film has a rating of 81% based on 74 reviews, with an average rating of 7.34/10. The website's critical consensus reads, "An audacious, unsettling Japanese horror film from director Takashi Miike, Audition entertains as both a grisly shocker and a psychological drama". On Metacritic, the film has a weighted average score of 69 out of 100, based on 19 critics, indicating "generally favorable reviews".

Ken Eisner (Variety) gave the film a positive review. The reviewer referred to the film as a "truly shocking horror film" that was "made even more disturbing by its haunting beauty". Geoffrey Macnab, writing in Sight and Sound, referred to the film as a "slow-burning but ultimately devastating horror pic" and wrote that "it's a virtuoso piece of film-making with much more subtlety and depth than Miike's other films". The Hollywood Reporter Frank Scheck described the film as "one of the most audacious, iconoclastic horror films in recent years". Mark Schilling (The Japan Times) praised Shiina and Ishibashi's acting, but noted that "among the film's few irritants is a smarmy, snarly bad guy turn by Renji Ishibashi as Asami's wheelchair-using ballet instructor. He is a reminder of where too many other Miike films have headed – straight for the video racks". Schilling concluded that "Miike is ready for a bigger role – as one of the leading Japanese directors of his generation". In the early 2010s, Time Out conducted a poll with several authors, directors, actors and critics who have worked within the horror genre to vote for their top horror films. Audition placed at number 18 on their top 100 list.

Final sequence response 
Writers for Variety, The Hollywood Reporter and Sight & Sound all emphasized the film's final scene. Scheck (The Hollywood Reporter) wrote that "Miike lulls the audience into a state of complacency with a studied, slow-moving, lightly comic first half before delivering a gruesome final section that makes Stephen King's Misery look wholesome"; the ending was "all the more shocking for the clinical way in which it is presented". Eisner (Variety) stated that it is only at the ending of the film that Audition "breaks out of creepfest ghetto".  In his essay on themes in Audition, Robin Wood stated that most of Miike's films are disturbing for "what they have to tell us about the state of contemporary civilization; they are not in the least disturbing in themselves, operating on some fantasy level of annihilation, with 'comic-book' violence". In comparison, he stated that Audition is "authentically disturbing, and infinitely more horrifying: the first time I watched it – on DVD, at home, after warnings I had received – I was repeatedly tempted, through the last half hour, to turn it off". Wood compared the film to Pier Paolo Pasolini's Salò, or the 120 Days of Sodom, stating that the film was "almost as unwatchable as the news reels – of Auschwitz, of the innocent victims of Hiroshima and Nagasaki and Vietnam, victims of Nazi or American dehumanization".

Of the film's success with Western audiences, Miike states that he was not surprised, but that he had "no idea what goes on in the minds of people in the West and I don't pretend to know what their tastes are. And I don't want to start thinking about that. It's nice that they liked my movie, but I'm not going to start deliberately worrying about why or what I can do to make it happen again". Actress Eihi Shiina stated that, in Japan, only a certain type of film fan would watch Audition. By comparison, she said, the film was seen by many more people overseas, which she attributed to "good timing".

Aftermath and influence

After the release of Audition, Miike was going to adapt Murakami's novel Coin Locker Babies, but the project failed to find enough financing.

Audition has been described as an influence on "torture porn". The term was invented by David Edelstein to describe films such as Saw, The Devil's Rejects and Wolf Creek that offer "titillating and shocking" scenes that push the audience to the margins of depravity in order for them to "feel something". Audition influenced American directors such as Eli Roth. Roth stated that Audition influenced him to make his film Hostel, with Miike even making a cameo as a satisfied customer of the kidnappers who let customers torture their victims. Richard Corliss, writing in Time, opined that Audition was different from torture porn films as: "unlike Saw and its imitators in the genre of torture porn, Audition doesn't go for gore-ific money shots. Miike's films live inside their characters, taking the temperature of their longings, the ridiculous ambitions they chase so obsessively and their need to experience the extreme to prove they're alive".

Audition has been referenced in western popular culture such as comics, music videos, and other media. It was listed by twin directors Jen and Sylvia Soska as one of their favourite horror films, and with the sisters saying that it was an influence on their film American Mary. The directors noted the character of Asami, stating that an audience generally sees: "female characters in a horror film as the helpless victim. This film leads you in one direction, skillfully hinting at a darker storyline for the otherwise meek and slight Asami until the final 15 minutes where we are introduced to a merciless monster. A perfect personification of the irrational rage of a woman scorned". Director Quentin Tarantino included Audition in his list of top 20 films released since 1992 (the year he became a director). Audition was among the films included in the book 1001 Movies You Must See Before You Die.

Deadline reported that executive producer Mario Kassar had begun work on an English language adaptation of Audition in 2014. Richard Gray was brought on to serve as the remake's director and screenwriter. The film's storyline would be taken from Ryu Murakami's novel as opposed to an adaptation of Miike's film, and the film would take place in North America. The new film would  include scenes and locations in the novel that were not in Miike's film.

See also

List of horror films of 1999
List of Japanese films of 1999

References

Further reading

External links
 
 

1999 films
1999 horror films
Japanese horror films
1990s Japanese-language films
1990s psychological drama films
Films based on horror novels
Japanese films about revenge
Films directed by Takashi Miike
Films based on Japanese novels
Films shot in Tokyo
Torture in films
1999 drama films
1990s exploitation films
Japanese splatter films
1990s Japanese films